IFOR was the Implementation Force, a NATO-led multinational peace enforcement force in Bosnia and Herzegovina.

IFOR may also refer to:
 International Fellowship of Reconciliation
 Ifor, a given name

See also
 IFORS, International Federation of Operational Research Societies